Ouabache [oʊ'bɑːtʃi] (a French transcription of the Miami Indian word for the river, waapaahšiiki, meaning "it shines white", "pure white", or "water over white stones") is a state park in Indiana. It was originally the Wells County State Forest and Game Preserve, formed in the early 1930s. In 1962. it became the Ouabache State Recreation Area, before finally achieving state park status in 1983.

The Wabash River runs through the park, which provides fishing and nature viewing. A  fire tower offers an excellent view of the park. The park receives about 200,000 visitors annually.

Until the 1960s, when the practice was stopped, it was the greatest producer of chicks of pheasants and quails in the United States, making it known as the "Greatest Wildlife Laboratory in the U.S."  Remnants of some of the old pens can still be seen.

During the Great Depression, workers from the Civilian Conservation Corps (CCC) helped to improve the park through various construction projects. Today, in the park's picnic area, is a statue commemorating the CCC's work in the park. The Friends of Ouabache State Park organization led a two-year fundraising effort to build the statue. The statue was dedicated in 2014. Similar statues commemorating the CCC exist across the United States, but the only other such statue in Indiana is in Versailles State Park in Ripley County.

The park is 1 of 14 Indiana State Parks that are in the path of totality for the 2024 solar eclipse, with the park experiencing 2 minutes and 47 seconds of totality.

References

External links
Indiana Department of Natural Resources official Web page

Protected areas established in 1962
State parks of Indiana
Protected areas of Wells County, Indiana